Bronzoni is an Italian surname. Notable people with the surname include:

Adamo Pedro Bronzoni (born 1985), Italian-Peruvian film editor and producer
William Bronzoni (1927–1987), Italian footballer

See also
Bronzini
Ronzoni

Italian-language surnames